The Youngstown State Penguins baseball team is a varsity intercollegiate athletic team of Youngstown State University in Youngstown, Ohio, United States. The team is a member of the Horizon League, which is part of the National Collegiate Athletic Association's Division I. The team plays its home games at Eastwood Field in Niles, Ohio. The Penguins are coached by Dan Bertolini.

Head coaches

See also
List of NCAA Division I baseball programs

References

External links